Propherallodus briggsi is a species of clingfish native to the coasts of Japan.  This species grows to a length of  SL.  This species is the only known member of its genus, it was described by Masaru Shiogaki and Yoshie Dotsu in 1983 with a type locality of Meshima Island, Japan. Its specific name honours the American ichthyologist John "Jack" C. Briggs (1920–2018).

See also
 Fujiwara, K., and H. Motomura (2019). A new species, Propherallodus longipterus, from the Philippines and redescription of P. briggsi Shiogaki and Dotsu 1983 (Gobiesocidae: Diplocrepinae). Ichthyological Research 66(1): 35–48.

References

Gobiesocidae
Monotypic fish genera
Fish of Japan
Fish described in 1983